Przemysław Cecherz (born 12 April 1973) is a Polish football manager and former player.

Career

After leaving Bałtyk Gdynia due to the financial situation there, Cecherz left for the United States, where he played for amateur clubs in the Polish community. Despite knowing he would not carve out a great playing career, he knew he would return to Poland to become a manager.

References

1973 births
Living people
Sportspeople from Łódź
Polish footballers
Bałtyk Gdynia players
Association football goalkeepers
Polish expatriate footballers
Expatriate soccer players in the United States
Polish expatriate sportspeople in the United States
Polish football managers
Górnik Zabrze managers
Wisła Płock managers
Hetman Zamość managers
Tur Turek managers
Stal Stalowa Wola managers
Znicz Pruszków managers
Świt Nowy Dwór Mazowiecki managers
Kolejarz Stróże managers
GKS Tychy managers
Raków Częstochowa managers
Widzew Łódź managers
KSZO Ostrowiec Świętokrzyski managers
Ekstraklasa managers
I liga managers
II liga managers